Presidential elections were held in the Republic of Upper Volta on 14 May 1978, with a second round on 28 May after no candidate won more than 50% in the first round. They were the country's first multi-party presidential elections, the previous elections in 1965 having Maurice Yaméogo as the sole candidate. They were also the first presidential elections held under a revised Constitution adopted a year earlier.

Incumbent president Sangoulé Lamizana ran as an independent with the support of the Voltaic Democratic Union–African Democratic Rally. Lamizana was the leading candidate in the first round, before winning with 56% of the vote in the second round. Voter turnout was 35% in the first round and 44% in the second.

Background
In 1966, Yaméogo was ousted after a general strike in opposition to his rule, and was replaced by a provisional military government led by Lamizana. In 1970, a new Constitution was ratified, which was later revised by a referendum held in 1977. The first parliamentary elections were held under the revised Constitution on 30 April 1978, with the first round of the presidential elections being held two weeks later.

Results

References

Presidential elections in Burkina Faso
Upper Volta
1978 in Upper Volta